Chew Chor Meng (born 20 November 1968), better known as Zhou Chuming, is a Singaporean actor. He is one of the first batch of actors to receive the All-Time Favourite Artiste award with Zoe Tay & Li Nanxing.

Acting career
Chew started his career in showbiz after winning Star Search in 1990, a bi-annual nationwide talent search. Since then, he has never failed to make it to the Top 10 Most Popular Male Artistes in the Star Awards, an award ceremony for TV personalities, since its inception in 1994. In 2004, Chew was awarded the All-Time Favourite Artiste with Li Nanxing and Zoe Tay.

He first earned his acting nomination for his role as Hong San in the 1995 epic The Teochew Family, which he's still known to audiences in China. This was also evident when he bagged the Best Actor Award in Star Awards 2000 in Hainan Kopi Tales. His popularity has also spread across the causeway as he was voted the Most Popular MediaCorp Male Artiste in Malaysia. He made his first crossover to English sitcom in Mr. Kiasu. During the late 1990s to early 2000s, he was best known for his role as Jacky Chang aka Ah Bee, a salesman with a penchant for grabbing 'lobangs' (good opportunities that cannot be missed) in the popular Channel 8 sitcom Don't Worry, Be Happy, which spanned for six seasons. Chew initially dropped out from the role of Ah Bee after the 3rd season due to fear of being typecast, and also because he wanted to focus more on drama and variety shows. He eventually reprised the role for the latter half of the 6th (and final) season for Don't Worry Be Happy, and appeared in a spinoff series Lobang King focusing on Ah Bee and his new league of friends.

Chew is known for his versatility and ability to portray different characters that leave a lasting impression. At the 25th anniversary special in 2007, his character Ah Bee was named as one of the most memorable TV roles and his role as the villain Li Kechun in The Reunion was voted the Top 10 most memorable villains. In 2009 he won the Best Supporting Actor award, despite the nominations being dominated by cast of the popular blockbuster series The Little Nyonya, for his portrayal of a promising young doctor driven to vice and insanity by unfortunate circumstances in The Golden Path.

Now a well-known household name, Chew has gone from acting in drama series to hosting shows and large-scale events including overseas collaborations with Taiwan and China. He was nominated for the Best Info-Ed Host Award at the Star Awards 2010 for co-hosting Food Hometown.

Chew's contract with MediaCorp was set to expire in October 2010. Due to his illness, Chew initially did not expect his contract to be renewed. However, reports surfaced in November 2010 that Chew's contract was renewed for a further two years, with particular emphasis on hosting and new artiste training duties. He made his acting comeback with Channel U's Show Hand, followed by Channel 8 30th anniversary drama special Joys of Life.

Before the contract extension, Chew was planning to enter the restaurant business, which would have been Chew's second foray into the eatery business.

Business career 
In 2017, Chew, Dennis Chew and two other partners opened a Thai Mookata (barbecue-cum-steamboat) stall, 888 Mookata, at a coffee shop in Hougang, Singapore. In 2018, after setting up their third stall, both Chews started a porridge stall, The Famous Zhou, or known in Chinese, Zhou Chu Ming (粥出名), a play on Chew's name and their surnames.

In 2023, Chew with Dennis Chew and two other friends opened a Thai bistro, Viewdee Thai Bistro, at Sprout Hub, Henderson.

Personal life
Chew graduated from Ngee Ann Polytechnic. He is married to Deon Tan and they have two daughters, born in 2002 and 2004. He revealed during a celebrity talk show in early 2008 that he did not have a happy childhood, often being abused by his overly strict father (a compulsive gambler and alcoholic), who committed suicide when Chew was still in primary school. He began attending a Charismatic church, Renewal Centre from 2007 and was baptised in late November 2008 with his daughters.

Illness
On 19 December 2008, Chew announced during a church event that he was suffering from Kennedy's disease, a muscular dystrophy illness that resulted in him limping while filming for his latest role as Wang Zhongkun in Love Blossoms II. Chew said that he was diagnosed with the illness in September 2008, and that he alerted the local press as to his condition, but asked the press to not report it yet, as he was psychologically not ready for it. Chew originally planned on officially announcing his illness during the Star Awards 2008 ceremony, due to be held in March 2009. However, signs of his illness can be clearly seen already, and the news was hard to keep under wraps. The illness has also brought on cardiac problems and diabetes for Chew.

Since the illness was revealed, Chew became a member of the local disabled sports club, and has been taking swimming lessons to strengthen his body.

Controversy
In September 2016, Chew appeared in episode 6 of I Want to Be a Star that had to be taken down from Toggle's website due to public outcry about the show's casual racism. Chew's character said onscreen that Indians and Africans are "all the same". Mediacorp's online service, has apologised on behalf of the show.

Filmography

Film

Television

Variety show

Compilation album

Awards and nominations

References

External links 
Profile on Toggle
 

20th-century Singaporean male actors
21st-century Singaporean male actors
Converts to Christianity from Buddhism
Singaporean male television actors
Singaporean male film actors
Singaporean Christians
1968 births
Living people
People with muscular dystrophy
Singaporean people of Teochew descent
Singaporean Charismatics